The Lawn Tennis Association (LTA) is the national governing body of tennis in Great Britain, the Channel Islands and the Isle of Man.

Founded in 1888, the LTA promotes all levels of lawn tennis. It believes that tennis can provide "physical, social and mental rewards both on and off the court." The National Tennis Centre (NTC) in Roehampton, southwest London serves as its main training facility. The Princess of Wales has been an LTA patron since 2017. Its first president was seven-time Wimbledon champion William Renshaw.

History

The British Lawn Tennis Association formed in 1888, eleven years after the first Wimbledon championship. It was tasked with maintaining the new rules and standards of the emerging sport of tennis in the United Kingdom.

In 1978, a government inquiry was carried out into the state of British tennis, which accused the LTA of complacency and a lack of action in developing the game. During the 1980s and 1990s, a number of initiatives were launched in an attempt to raise the profile of tennis in the UK, and to promote interest and participation in the sport outside of the Wimbledon fortnight. Millions of pounds were invested in the building of indoor centres, and on coaching and training initiatives. However, by the end of the 1990s, it was clear that these broad initiatives were not having the desired effect, so the LTA turned to more targeted approaches with the aim of: attracting and keeping juniors in the game; changing the culture among clubs to become more "junior friendly"; identifying the best young players and helping them develop. This led to the launch in 2000 of Club Vision, a new strategy for providing greater support and resources to progressive tennis clubs, followed in 2001 by the City Tennis Club programme, which was specifically aimed at encouraging young players from diverse/deprived backgrounds in inner-city areas.

In 2004, the Lawn Tennis Association considered changing its name to "Tennis GB" in an attempt to shake off its old-fashioned middle-class image, and attract more young people to the sport, but the proposed move was not implemented.

In March 2019, the LTA launched a new initiative called "Tennis Opened Up" to promote the sport to a wider audience, with a stated mission "to grow tennis by making it relevant, accessible, welcoming and enjoyable". Alongside the initiative, there was also a major rebranding strategy in which the full name "Lawn Tennis Association" was discarded and a new LTA logo was unveiled.

The National Tennis Centre

The National Tennis Centre (NTC) is located at Roehampton in southwest London, close to the All England Club in Wimbledon. Officially opened in 2007 by Queen Elizabeth II, the NTC is a focal point for Britain's top tennis players, with 22 courts, player accommodation and a sports science centre.

Tennis courts
The NTC has twelve acrylic hard courts (six indoor, six outdoor), six clay courts, and four grass courts.

Hard courts – The NTC's acrylic courts have a GreenSet Grand Prix Acrylic surface. The indoor courts have a sprung timber sub-frame, while the outdoor courts are laid directly on asphalt. This GreenSet surface is used at many international tournaments including the 2 Hard court Grand Slam tournaments Australian Open and US Open, Davis Cup, Fed Cup, WTA Tour and ATP Tour events.

Clay courts – The NTC has two different types of outdoor clay courts which have been designed to withstand the harsh UK climate and to allow for the longest possible clay court playing season and maximum use. There are four Italian clay courts (identical to the courts used at Foro Italico and Monte Carlo), and two French-Court synthetic clay courts.

Grass courts – The LTA consulted All England Lawn Tennis Club head groundsman Eddie Seaward to advise on the installation of its four outdoor grass courts. The quality and playing characteristics replicate those found at the Wimbledon Championships.

Training facilities
Along with its 22 tennis courts, the NTC is equipped with a state-of-the-art gymnasium, outdoor sprint track, hydrotherapy, plunge pools and relaxation 'egg'. There is overnight accommodation for up to 54 people, along with a player lounge and recreation room.

Sports science centre
The National Tennis Centre provides services in Strength & Conditioning, Medical and Physiotherapy, Performance Analysis, Nutrition, Performance Lifestyle and Psychology.
 
The Sports Science and Medicine team at the NTC supports Britain's elite players with the following:
 
 Strength & Conditioning – Maximising players’ athletic potential through developing their power, strength, speed, movement and fitness
 Medical and Physiotherapy – Supporting all aspects of physical health from short term illnesses and minor injuries through to long term injury rehab
 Performance Analysis – Developing players’ knowledge and understanding of their game and progress against their goals
 Nutrition – Supporting and educating players to make the right food choices in order to fuel and repair their body effectively and perform to their best
 Performance Lifestyle – Coaching and supporting players and their coaches/teams to navigate off court, personal, wellbeing or transition situations
 Psychology – Supporting players and their coaches/teams to develop psychological skills and strategies to enhance on court performance

LTA Coaching Qualifications

The LTA is also responsible for administering and implementing tennis coaching at all levels in the UK. The current structure is as follows:

Level 1 – Coaching Assistant – The Level 1 Coaching Assistant is an introduction to tennis coaching. Level 1's are qualified to plan and deliver a structured lesson under the guidance of an accredited coaches.

Level 2 – Coaching Assistant – Level 2 Coaching Assistants are qualified to coach groups of beginners of any age, on their own, under the umbrella programme of an accredited Coach.

Level 3 – Coach qualification – The Coach Qualification covers the key coaching skills required to be an effective coach to work with beginners and improvers of any age in groups or individually. At this level they are then eligible to gain Coach Accreditation; this ensures they are up-to-date with the latest tennis knowledge, they are First Aid qualified and have a satisfactory criminal record check.

Level 4 – Senior Club Coach qualification – This qualification is aimed at coaches who would like to manage a section of a commercial club or team of coaches.

Level 4 – Senior Performance Coach qualification – This course is designed for coaches who wish to develop their knowledge and skills to develop international junior players aged 14 and under.

Level 5 – Master Club Coach qualification – Upon completion of the course, a Master Club Coach will be able to deliver high quality on court sessions at clubs, mentor a team of coaches, and implement and assess a club programme.

Level 5 – Master Performance Coach qualification – Master Performance Coaches are equipped to work with international performance junior players, aged 11 – 18 years. The course is designed to develop coaches to be versatile and transition between different performance players and environments.

See also
Tennis Scotland
Tennis Wales
List of British singles finalists at Grand Slam tennis tournaments

References

External links
Official LTA site

1888 establishments in the United Kingdom
Great Britain
Organisations based in the London Borough of Wandsworth
Roehampton
Sport in the London Borough of Wandsworth
Sports governing bodies in the United Kingdom
Tennis in the United Kingdom